The Oxford Companion to Beer, abbreviated OCB, is a book in the series of Oxford Companions published by Oxford University Press. The book provides an alphabetically arranged reference to beer, compiled and edited by Garrett Oliver with a foreword by U.S. chef Tom Colicchio. Published in 2011, the work draws on 166 contributors from 24 countries to amass over 1,100 entries on beer.

Reception 
Eric Asimov of The New York Times described the work as a "mammoth undertaking ... encyclopedic in scope", and that the editor has "captured the blossoming of a global beer culture at a thriving moment".

Critical opinion of the work has also been voiced, with contentions that the OCB perpetuates certain beer history myths, and other omissions published by writers and beer enthusiasts, some of whom OCB contributors themselves. Shortly after publication an unofficial wiki site was launched to "make comments, add annotation, identify errata and suggest further sources to the text of The Oxford Companion to Beer".

References

External links 
 OUP U.S. and OUP UK The Oxford Companion to Beer information

2011 non-fiction books
Oxford University Press reference books